Nancy Bermeo is an American political scientist, and senior research fellow at Nuffield College, University of Oxford.  She previously held the position of Nuffield Chair of Comparative Politics at Oxford.

Bermeo won the Stanley Kelley Teaching Prize at Princeton University in 1998 and the Oxford University Excellence in Teaching Award in 2009.

Bermeo has a PhD from Yale University.

She has been Nuffield Chair of Comparative Politics at Nuffield College, University of Oxford, since 2007.

Bermeo is of Ecuadorian, Irish, and Danish heritage.

Selected publications
Continuity and Crisis: Popular Reactions to the Great Recession (ed. with Larry Bartels 2013)
Coping with Crisis: Government Reactions to the Great Recession (ed. with Jonas Pontusson 2012)
Ordinary People in Extraordinary Times: The Citizenry and the Collapse of Democracy, Princeton University Press, 2003.
The Revolution within the Revolution: Workers' Control in Rural Portugal, Princeton University Press, 1986.
Myths of Moderation: Confrontation and Conflict during Democratic Transitions. Comparative Politics, vol. 29, no. 3, 1997, pp. 305–22. JSTOR,

References

External links 

 

Fellows of Nuffield College, Oxford
Academics of the University of Oxford
Living people
Year of birth missing (living people)
Yale University alumni
Princeton University faculty
American women political scientists
American political scientists
Mount Holyoke College alumni
British women non-fiction writers
American women academics
21st-century American women